Ali Akbar Rezaei (born 1972 in Tehran) has a PhD in cultural management and is a member of the scientific board and assistant professor of management and economics department of Science and Research Branch Islamic Azad University. He is a member of the board of Islamic Republic of Iran Broadcasting Iran Cultural management & planning Association and award winner in Paydari Festival, He is also a member of the Board of Iran Strategic Management Society.

In 2012, he was the president of Non-Aligned Movement International Scientific Conference and, In 2015, the secretary of the first conference on the role of elite artists and athletes in society cultural evolution. He has also had a variety of activities in the different cultural fields, including the research president of Academy of Arts, and produced some documentaries and series in the Islamic Republic of Iran Broadcasting and the president of cultural department in  Islamic Azad University South Tehran Branch.

Bibliography 

 Some documents from the party of Iran, 2012
 Communication, psychological warfare and public opinion, 2009
 Familiarization with passive defense, 2011
 The role of management information systems at the decision urban traffic managers, 2015
 Familiarization with the basics of planning and cultural planning, 2008
 Observational on spaces of urban, 2015
 Fadayian Eslam, 2012
 Articles of the history and documents, 2012
 Documents of the Government of Shahid Rajaee, 2012
 Blood fist, 2002
 Burkina Faso, 2003
 The neurological emergency, 2003
 Public opinion and its measurement methods in psychological warfare, 2010
 Religious values governing defense, 2011
 Strategic planning in the management of cultural organizations and institutions of Iran, 2016
 Familiarization with the evaluation model and its application in projects, organizations and cultural institutions, 2014
 Cultural vocabulary and terminology management (bi-directional), 2015
 Regional planning for managers, 2011
 The initiative in planning and evaluating the cultural performance, 2011
 Cultural diplomacy: the role of culture in the foreign policy and provide strategic model, 2011
 Documents of internal migration in Iran, 2012
 Crisis Management, 2011

References 

 * Researches
 * Portal University

1972 births
Living people
Academic staff of the Islamic Azad University, Central Tehran Branch